Verra Cruz, are an English rock band trio originally from St Albans, England. They formed in 2003, and have since released two studio albums and one extended play.

Background
They were formed by vocalist, guitarist, and lap steel player, Marc James and drummer, Jimmy Cooke, in St Albans, England, during 2003. They would add Nick Bright as their bassist in September 2000, after his departure they filled the position with Josh Jones, while now it is occupied by Henry Cross.

Music history
The band started as a music entity, under their first moniker Dust, in 1996. They released one studio album, All or Nothing, in 1996, while they would release three extended plays, See Red in 1998, Spirit in 1999, and Invisible in 2001. Their moniker would change to Verra Cruz, with their 2003 extended play release, Soul Collides, and the trio would release two studio albums, Emancipation Day in 2006, and Innocence in 2008.

They had two songs reviewed, "Corner of My Mind", and "Soul Collides".

Discography
Albums
 Emancipation Day (2006, as Verra Cruz)
 Innocence (2008, as Verra Cruz)
EPs
 Soul Collides (2003, as Verra Cruz)
 Violent Sun (2016, as Verra Cruz)

References

External links
Official website

English Christian musical groups
English blues musical groups
English Christian rock groups
English hard rock musical groups
English rock music groups
Musical groups established in 1996